The 2016–17 Delaware State Hornets men's basketball team represented Delaware State University during the 2016–17 NCAA Division I men's basketball season. The Hornets, led by third-year head coach Keith Walker, played their home games at Memorial Hall as members of the Mid-Eastern Athletic Conference. They finished the season 10–22, 7–9 in MEAC play to finish in a three-way tie for seventh place. They lost in the first round of the MEAC tournament to Bethune–Cookman.

Previous season
The Hornets finished the 2015–16 season 7–25, 5–11 record in MEAC play to finish in a tie for 12th place. They lost to Savannah State in the first round of the MEAC tournament.

Preseason 
The Hornets were picked to finish 12th in the MEAC preseason poll. Devin Morgan was selected the All-MEAC preseason second team and DeAndre Haywood was picked for the third team.

Roster

Schedule and results

|-
!colspan=9 style=| Non-conference regular season

|-
!colspan=9 style=| MEAC regular season

|-
!colspan=9 style=| MEAC tournament

References

Delaware State Hornets men's basketball seasons
Delaware State
Horn
Horn